WZDS-LD, virtual channel 5 (UHF digital channel 18), is a Heroes & Icons owned-and-operated station digital low-powered television station that is licensed to and located in Evansville, Indiana, United States. The station is owned by Chicago-based Weigel Broadcasting. The station transmits its signal from tower located near John James Audubon State Park in Henderson, Kentucky, sharing tower space with CBS primary/Fox subchannel-only affiliate WEVV-TV.

History 
The FCC issued a construction permit to DTV America Corporation on August 12, 2012, under callsign W12DN-D. The station's callsign was changed to the current WZDS-LD on September 6, 2016. Still silent, the station was sold to HC2 Holdings in 2018. The station went on the air on December 7, 2021, three months after the station was sold to Weigel Broadcasting in September. WZDS's sign on marked the return of Heroes & Icons to the Evansville area following the event of WTSN-CD having dropped their affiliation in favor of Antenna TV. In addition, WZDS also signed on three additional subchannels to accommodate Wiegel's other networks, Start TV, Decades and Movies!. In April 2022, the station's DT5 subchannel was launched to broadcast the company's newest network, Story Television.

The station is broadcasting on the former frequency of WJTS-CD in nearby Jasper, Indiana, which has moved to UHF channel 24 prior to WZDS's sign-on.

Digital television

Digital channels
The station's digital signal is multiplexed.

References

External links

WZDS-LD REC Broadcast Query

Low-power television stations in the United States
Weigel Broadcasting
ZDS-LD
Decades (TV network) affiliates
Heroes & Icons affiliates
Movies! affiliates
Start TV affiliates